An-Sophie Mestach and Laura Robson were the defending champions, but both players chose not to participate.

Asia Muhammad and Maria Sanchez won the title, defeating Sophie Chang and Alexandra Mueller in the final, 6–3, 6–4.

Seeds

Draw

Draw

References
Main Draw

Red Rock Pro Open - Doubles
2018 Red Rock Pro Open